Atlin was a provincial electoral district in the Canadian province of British Columbia.  It made its first appearance on the hustings in the 10th provincial general election in 1903 and last appeared in the 34th provincial general election in 1986, after which it was merged with the Skeena riding and was succeeded by Bulkley Valley-Stikine.

Demographics

Political geography 

Always one of the province's largest ridings by area, it was always among the smallest in population, and is often cited as an example of a lack of proper representation-by-population in the BC political system. From the perspective of riding residents, who are spread out in a handful of small settlements from the Nass River to the Yukon border, a riding incorporating larger population centres was unfair to them.  Ultimately the pressure to redress lack of equality in voting-weight among BC ridings saw the Atlin riding became merged with Skeena riding.

Notable elections

Because of its small electorate, battles over spoiled ballots were critical in Atlin's electoral history:
The 1928 election saw a 567/542/32 three-way split in favour of Herbert Frederick Kergin of the BC Liberal Party, with 22 rejected ballots
The 1945 election saw a 297/292 split in favour of William Duncan Smith of the Liberal-Conservative Coalition, with no rejected ballots
The 1949 election saw a 376/370 split in favour of Frank Calder, then a candidate for the Co-operative Commonwealth Federation (CCF) - with 190 rejected ballots.
The 1956 election saw a 450/360/131 split in favour of William James Asselstine of the Social Credit, with 59 rejected ballots.
the 1979 election saw a 750/749 split in favour of Al Passarell of the New Democratic Party over Frank Calder, who had switched sides to Social Credit in the 1975 British Columbia general election - with 39 rejected ballots

First Nations

Another important factor in the Atlin riding was the dominance of its First Nations population, including the whole of the Nisga'a Nation (Frank Calder and Larry Guno were both Nisga'a).  Also in the riding in its entirety was the Tahltan Nation, centred on the isolated towns of Telegraph Creek and Dease Lake.  The area of the town of Atlin is part of the Inland Tlingit Nation.

Towns and industry 

Another factor in the riding was the dominance of working men in its handful of industrial towns (principally mining).

The main towns in the riding were:

Atlin
Teslin
Dease Lake
Telegraph Creek
Anyox (now a ghost town, formerly a large smelter town)
Stewart

Notable MLAs 

The most notable Member of the Legislative Assembly from Atlin was Frank Calder.  A Nisga'a, he originally ran for the CCF, and then the NDP, but in the 1975 election he switched sides to Social Credit, but went down to defeat under that party's banner in 1979 and retired from electoral politics.

Electoral history 
Note: Winners of each election are in bold.

|-

|- bgcolor="white"
!align="right" colspan=3|Total valid votes
!align="right"|438
!align="right"|100.00%
!align="right"|
|- bgcolor="white"
!align="right" colspan=3|Total rejected ballots
!align="right"|
!align="right"|
!align="right"|
|- bgcolor="white"
!align="right" colspan=3|Turnout
!align="right"|%
!align="right"|
!align="right"|
|}

|-

|- bgcolor="white"
!align="right" colspan=3|Total valid votes
!align="right"|124
!align="right"|100.00%
!align="right"|
|- bgcolor="white"
!align="right" colspan=3|Total rejected ballots
!align="right"|
!align="right"|
!align="right"|
|- bgcolor="white"
!align="right" colspan=3|Turnout
!align="right"|%
!align="right"|
!align="right"|
|}

|-

|- bgcolor="white"
!align="right" colspan=3|Total valid votes
!align="right"|172
!align="right"|100.00%
!align="right"|
|- bgcolor="white"
!align="right" colspan=3|Total rejected ballots
!align="right"|
!align="right"|
!align="right"|
|- bgcolor="white"
!align="right" colspan=3|Turnout
!align="right"|%
!align="right"|
!align="right"|
|}

|-

|- bgcolor="white"
!align="right" colspan=3|Total valid votes
!align="right"|-
!align="right"|--.--%
!align="right"|
|- bgcolor="white"
!align="right" colspan=3|Total rejected ballots
!align="right"|
!align="right"|
!align="right"|
|- bgcolor="white"
!align="right" colspan=3|Turnout
!align="right"|%
!align="right"|
!align="right"|
|}

|-

|- bgcolor="white"
!align="right" colspan=3|Total valid votes
!align="right"|606
!align="right"|100.00%
!align="right"|
|- bgcolor="white"
!align="right" colspan=3|Total rejected ballots
!align="right"|
!align="right"|
!align="right"|
|- bgcolor="white"
!align="right" colspan=3|Turnout
!align="right"|%
!align="right"|
!align="right"|
|}

|-

|- bgcolor="white"
!align="right" colspan=3|Total valid votes
!align="right"|1,196
!align="right"|100.00%
!align="right"|
|- bgcolor="white"
!align="right" colspan=3|Total rejected ballots
!align="right"|
!align="right"|
!align="right"|
|- bgcolor="white"
!align="right" colspan=3|Turnout
!align="right"|%
!align="right"|
!align="right"|
|}

|-

|Independent
|William Herbert Moult
|align="right"|32
|align="right"|2.76%
|align="right"|
|align="right"|unknown
|- bgcolor="white"
!align="right" colspan=3|Total valid votes
!align="right"|1,161
!align="right"|100.00%
!align="right"|
|- bgcolor="white"
!align="right" colspan=3|Total rejected ballots
!align="right"|22
!align="right"|
!align="right"|
|- bgcolor="white"
!align="right" colspan=3|Turnout
!align="right"|%
!align="right"|
!align="right"|
|}

|-

|Independent
|Herbert Frederick Kergin
|align="right"|267
|align="right"|20.79%
|align="right"|
|align="right"|unknown
|- bgcolor="white"
!align="right" colspan=3|Total valid votes
!align="right"|1,284
!align="right"|100.00%
!align="right"|
|- bgcolor="white"
!align="right" colspan=3|Total rejected ballots
!align="right"|34
!align="right"|
!align="right"|
|- bgcolor="white"
!align="right" colspan=3|Turnout
!align="right"|%
!align="right"|
!align="right"|
|}

|-

|Co-operative Commonwealth
|Charles H. Lake 
|align="right"|263
|align="right"|25.53%
|align="right"|
|align="right"|unknown

|- bgcolor="white"
!align="right" colspan=3|Total valid votes
!align="right"|1,030
!align="right"|100.00%
!align="right"|
|- bgcolor="white"
!align="right" colspan=3|Total rejected ballots
!align="right"|31
!align="right"|
!align="right"|
|- bgcolor="white"
!align="right" colspan=3|Turnout
!align="right"|%
!align="right"|
!align="right"|
|}

|-

|Labour
|John Scott
|align="right"|374
|align="right"|45.17%
|align="right"|
|align="right"|unknown
|- bgcolor="white"
!align="right" colspan=3|Total valid votes
!align="right"|828
!align="right"|100.00%
!align="right"|
|- bgcolor="white"
!align="right" colspan=3|Total rejected ballots
!align="right"|24
!align="right"|
!align="right"|
|- bgcolor="white"
!align="right" colspan=3|Turnout
!align="right"|%
!align="right"|
!align="right"|
|}

|-

|Co-operative Commonwealth Fed.
|Norman Cunningham
|align="right"|292
|align="right"|49.58%

|- bgcolor="white"
!align="right" colspan=3|Total valid votes
!align="right"|589
!align="right"|100.00%
!align="right"|
|- bgcolor="white"
!align="right" colspan=3|Total rejected ballots
!align="right"|0
|}

|-

|Co-operative Commonwealth Fed.
|Frank Arthur Calder
|align="right"|376
|align="right"|50.40%

|- bgcolor="white"
!align="right" colspan=3|Total valid votes
!align="right"|746
!align="right"|100.00%
!align="right"|
|- bgcolor="white"
!align="right" colspan=3|Total rejected ballots
!align="right"|190
!align="right"|
!align="right"|
|- bgcolor="white"
!align="right" colspan=3|Turnout
!align="right"|%
!align="right"|
!align="right"|
|}

|-

|Co-operative Commonwealth Fed.
|Frank Arthur Calder
|align="right"|595      
|align="right"|56.61%
|align="right"|595
|align="right"|56.61%
|align="right"|
|align="right"|unknown

|Progressive Conservative
|Thomas Sutherland MacKay
|align="right"|164               
|align="right"|15.60% 
|align="right"|164  
|align="right"|15.60%
|align="right"|
|align="right"|unknown

|align="right"|
|align="right"|unknown
|- bgcolor="white"
!align="right" colspan=3|Total valid votes
!align="right"|1,051                
!align="right"|100.00%
!align="right"|1,051 
!align="right"|%
!align="right"|
|- bgcolor="white"
!align="right" colspan=3|Total rejected ballots
!align="right"|44
!align="right"|
!align="right"|
|- bgcolor="white"
!align="right" colspan=3|Turnout
!align="right"|%
!align="right"|
!align="right"|
|- bgcolor="white"
!align="right" colspan=9|1 preferential ballot - only 1 count needed
|}

|Co-operative Commonwealth Fed.
|Frank Arthur Calder
|align="right"|553    
|align="right"|59.08%
|align="right"|553
|align="right"|59.08%
|align="right"|
|align="right"|unknown

|align="right"|
|align="right"|unknown
|- bgcolor="white"
!align="right" colspan=3|Total valid votes
!align="right"|936 	  	 	  	       
!align="right"|100.00%
!align="right"|936  
!align="right"|%
!align="right"|
|- bgcolor="white"
!align="right" colspan=3|Total rejected ballots
!align="right"|125
!align="right"|
!align="right"|
!align="right"|
!align="right"|
|- bgcolor="white"
!align="right" colspan=3|Total Registered Voters
!align="right"|5,933 (1952 list)
!align="right"|
!align="right"|
!align="right"|
!align="right"|
|- bgcolor="white"
!align="right" colspan=3|Turnout
!align="right"|%
!align="right"|
!align="right"|
!align="right"|
!align="right"|
|- bgcolor="white"
!align="right" colspan=9|Preferential ballot; only one count needed
|}

|-

|Co-operative Commonwealth Fed.
|Frank Arthur Calder 
|align="right"|360
|align="right"|38.10%
|align="right"|
|align="right"|unknown

|- bgcolor="white"
!align="right" colspan=3|Total valid votes
!align="right"|945
!align="right"|100.00%
!align="right"|
|- bgcolor="white"
!align="right" colspan=3|Total rejected ballots
!align="right"|59
!align="right"|
!align="right"|
|- bgcolor="white"
!align="right" colspan=3|Turnout
!align="right"|%
!align="right"|
!align="right"|
|}

|-

|Co-operative Commonwealth Fed.
|Frank Arthur Calder
|align="right"|444
|align="right"|53.30%
|align="right"|
|align="right"|unknown
|- bgcolor="white"
!align="right" colspan=3|Total valid votes
!align="right"|833
!align="right"|100.00%
!align="right"|
|- bgcolor="white"
!align="right" colspan=3|Total rejected ballots
!align="right"|85
!align="right"|
!align="right"|
|- bgcolor="white"
!align="right" colspan=3|Turnout
!align="right"|%
!align="right"|
!align="right"|
|}

|-

|- bgcolor="white"
!align="right" colspan=3|Total valid votes
!align="right"|1,008
!align="right"|100.00%
!align="right"|
|- bgcolor="white"
!align="right" colspan=3|Total rejected ballots
!align="right"|19
!align="right"|
!align="right"|
|- bgcolor="white"
!align="right" colspan=3|Turnout
!align="right"|%
!align="right"|
!align="right"|
|}

|-

|- bgcolor="white"
!align="right" colspan=3|Total valid votes
!align="right"|958
!align="right"|100.00%
!align="right"|
|- bgcolor="white"
!align="right" colspan=3|Total rejected ballots
!align="right"|10
!align="right"|
!align="right"|
|- bgcolor="white"
!align="right" colspan=3|Turnout
!align="right"|%
!align="right"|
!align="right"|
|}

|-

|- bgcolor="white"
!align="right" colspan=3|Total valid votes
!align="right"|1,203
!align="right"|100.00%
!align="right"|
|- bgcolor="white"
!align="right" colspan=3|Total rejected ballots
!align="right"|13
!align="right"|
!align="right"|
|- bgcolor="white"
!align="right" colspan=3|Turnout
!align="right"|%
!align="right"|
!align="right"|
|}

|-

|Progressive Conservative
|Glen Leslie Clayton
|align="right"|65
|align="right"|3.95%
|align="right"|
|align="right"|unknown

|Independent
|Peter John Curran
|align="right"|242
|align="right"|14.69%
|align="right"|
|align="right"|unknown

|- bgcolor="white"
!align="right" colspan=3|Total valid votes
!align="right"|1,467
!align="right"|100.00%
!align="right"|
|- bgcolor="white"
!align="right" colspan=3|Total rejected ballots
!align="right"|27
!align="right"|
!align="right"|
|- bgcolor="white"
!align="right" colspan=3|Turnout
!align="right"|%
!align="right"|
!align="right"|
|}

|-

|- bgcolor="white"
!align="right" colspan=3|Total valid votes
!align="right"|1,773
!align="right"|100.00%
!align="right"|
|- bgcolor="white"
!align="right" colspan=3|Total rejected ballots
!align="right"|22
!align="right"|
!align="right"|
|- bgcolor="white"
!align="right" colspan=3|Turnout
!align="right"|%
!align="right"|
!align="right"|
|}

|-

|- bgcolor="white"
!align="right" colspan=3|Total valid votes
!align="right"|1,499
!align="right"|100.00%
!align="right"|
|- bgcolor="white"
!align="right" colspan=3|Total rejected ballots
!align="right"|39
!align="right"|
!align="right"|
|- bgcolor="white"
!align="right" colspan=3|Turnout
!align="right"|%
!align="right"|
!align="right"|
|}

|-

|Independent
|Paul Danny Brohman
|align="right"|84
|align="right"|2.82%
|align="right"|
|align="right"|unknown

|Independent
|Burgess A. Longson
|align="right"|105
|align="right"|3.52%
|align="right"|
|align="right"|unknown

|- bgcolor="white"
!align="right" colspan=3|Total valid votes
!align="right"|2,984
!align="right"|70.76%
!align="right"|
|- bgcolor="white"
!align="right" colspan=3|Total rejected ballots
!align="right"|393
!align="right"|
!align="right"|
|- bgcolor="white"
!align="right" colspan=3|Turnout
!align="right"|%
!align="right"|
!align="right"|
|}

|-

|- bgcolor="white"
!align="right" colspan=3|Total valid votes
!align="right"|2,301
!align="right"|100.00%
!align="right"|
|- bgcolor="white"
!align="right" colspan=3|Total rejected ballots
!align="right"|31
!align="right"|
!align="right"|
|- bgcolor="white"
!align="right" colspan=3|Turnout
!align="right"|%
!align="right"|
!align="right"|
|}

Former provincial electoral districts of British Columbia